Philip Vischjager (born 27 October 1958, Rotterdam) is a Dutch backgammon player. Although he began playing backgammon in 1975, he started training more intensively using computer software in 2001. At the same time, he became a regular participant in Dutch backgammon competitions at the highest national levels. In the period 2001-2005, he won the Dutch Open and the Amsterdam Open twice, and reached the Dutch Open finals three times. In 2006 Vischjager won the 31st World Championship Backgammon held in Monte Carlo.

Vischjager is a real estate investor and lives in Amsterdam.

References

 

1958 births
Living people
Dutch backgammon players
Sportspeople from Rotterdam
Sportspeople from Amstelveen